Joseph J. Cappucci (1913-1992) was a U.S. Air Force brigadier general (Special Agent) who served as the first director of the Defense Investigative Service and the 6th Commander of the Air Force Office of Special Investigations (AFOSI or OSI). As the Defense Investigative Service director, he oversaw its tasks of facilitating personnel security investigations, supervising industrial security, and performing security education and awareness training. As the AFOSI commander, he was responsible for providing independent professional investigative services to commanders of all U.S. Air Force activities about fraud, counterintelligence and major criminal matters by using a worldwide network of agents stationed at all major Air Force installations and at a variety of special operating locations. He also served as the director of special investigations within the Office of the Inspector General of the U.S. Air Force while commanding AFOSI.

Education
Cappucci graduated from University of Wyoming in June 1935. Besides the Command and General Staff School, he also attended the U.S. Air Force Special Investigations School, British Secret Intelligence School, Air Intelligence School, Radar Observer Intelligence School and the Airborne School, and holds the ratings of parachutist and gliderman.

Military career
Upon graduation from the Reserve Officers Training Corps program, Cappucci commissioned as a second lieutenant into the U.S. Army Air Corps Reserve. Early in his career, Cappucci performed duties as a counterintelligence and intelligence officer. He was also placed on special duty with the British Intelligence Service and provided detached service to the Central Intelligence Agency. Cappucci assignments included an overseas posting at the Directorate of Special Investigations, U.S. Air Forces Europe (USAFE), where he served as chief of the Counterintelligence Division. While in USAFE, he was a member of various intelligence boards in Germany, France and other areas in USAFE, and was responsible for putting into effect a counterintelligence program throughout all USAFE areas of interest. Cappucci would go on to lead other divisions and commanded at the wing-level. Prior to his assignment as Commander of AFOSI, Cappucci served as the director of special investigations within the Office of the Inspector General of the U.S. Air Force and commanded the 1005th Special Investigations Group, which was a worldwide centrally directed organization. After commanding AFOSI, Cappucci was appointed the first director of the Defense Investigative Service, which was his last assignment.

President Kennedy assassination conspiracy theory
In the late 1960s, Cappucci was commander of the 1005th Special Investigations Group, which gave him access to many individuals in the intelligence community including a close and long-term relationship with former FBI director J. Edgar Hoover. During a dinner at a hotel in Rome, Italy, with Lieutenant Colonel William H. Amos and his wife, Cappuci talked at length about inside knowledge of Mary Jo Kopechne's death inside of former Senator Ted Kennedy's car at Chappaquiddick Island, MA. It became clear to Mrs. Amos, Cappucci obtained inside information about the investigation of the accident from Hoover and how Ms. Kopechne's parents agreed to a settlement with Senator Kennedy to remain silent. Afterwards, the conversation turned to former President John F. Kennedy's assassination wherein Cappucci told the couple, "it was no wonder LBJ had JFK killed." After the dinner, Lt Col Amos told his wife to never repeat what Cappucci said, which she did for nearly 50 years.

Major awards and decorations 
Cappucci is the recipient of the following:

 National Order of Vietnam in grade of Knight
 Vietnamese Air Service Honor Medal
 Republic of China Police Medal
 Republic of China Order of National Security Merit Cheon-Su Medal

Personal life
Cappucci was married to his wife, the former Barbara Wade Gibson, of Falls Church, Virginia, for 50 years until he died at the age of 79 to cancer. They are buried together at Arlington National Cemetery.

See also
 List of Commanders of the Air Force Office of Special Investigations

References

External links 
 

1913 births
1992 deaths
United States Air Force Office of Special Investigations
United States Air Force generals
University of Wyoming alumni
Recipients of the Air Force Distinguished Service Medal
Recipients of the Legion of Merit
Burials at Arlington National Cemetery